Rafi Zabor (born Joel Zaborovsky, August 22, 1946) is a Brooklyn, New York–based music journalist- and musician-turned-novelist.

Life and work
A graduate of Brooklyn College, Zabor became a jazz critic for Musician in 1977, and later became an editor for the magazine.

He received the 1998 PEN/Faulkner Award for Fiction for his first novel, The Bear Comes Home, which follows an alto saxophonist – who happens to be a bear – in his pursuit of musical perfection.

Zabor's second book, the memoir I, Wabenzi, was commercially unsuccessful and met with mixed critical response.

In 2008, Zabor received an NEA Literature Fellowship.

, he was reportedly working on a new novel, to be titled The Bosphorus Dogs.

Zabor is also a jazz drummer.

Bibliography
 The Bear Comes Home (1997)
 I, Wabenzi (2005)

References

External links
 "Of the Tree and its Four Birds" by Rafi Zabor, at Words Without Borders

1946 births
Living people
20th-century American novelists
American people of Polish-Jewish descent
American male novelists
21st-century American novelists
PEN/Faulkner Award for Fiction winners
20th-century American male writers
21st-century American male writers
Brooklyn College alumni